Chisti Nagar or Chishti Nagar  is a residential neighbourhood in the Orangi municipality of Karachi, Pakistan. 

It is administered as part of Karachi West district, but was part of the Orangi Town borough until that was disbanded in 2011.

There are several ethnic groups including Muhajirs, Sindhis, Kashmiris, Seraikis, Pakhtuns, Balochis, Memons, Bohras Ismailis, etc. Over 99% of the population is Muslim. The population of Orangi town is estimated to be nearly one million.

This neighbourhood is named in honour of famous Sufi Hazrat Khawaja Mu'īnuddīn Chishtī of Chishti Order.

There are less government but more private schools trying to make the people of this area educated, and make their future bright.

There are so many private institutes providing quality education to the students of Chishti Nagar in various faculties, including Science, Computer, Commerce and English language.

References

External links 
 Karachi Website

Neighbourhoods of Karachi
Orangi Town